Schuttrange is a commune and small town in southern Luxembourg. It is located east of Luxembourg City.

, the town of Schuttrange, which lies in the centre of the commune, has a population of 825.  Other towns within the commune include Munsbach, Neuhäusgen, Schrassig, and Übersyren.

Population

References

External links
 

 
Communes in Luxembourg (canton)
Towns in Luxembourg